Ikramullah Khan (born 12 July 1992) is a Pakistani-born cricketer who plays for the Qatar cricket team. He played 18 first-class, 11 List A and two Twenty20 matches in Pakistan between 2008/09 and 2014/15. In December 2021, in the 2011–12 Quaid-e-Azam Trophy in Pakistan, Khan took eight wickets for 51 runs for Abbottabad against Karachi Blues. In October 2021, he was named in Qatar's Twenty20 International (T20I) squad for the Group A matches of the 2021 ICC Men's T20 World Cup Asia Qualifier tournament in Qatar.

References

External links
 

1992 births
Living people
Pakistani cricketers
Qatari cricketers
Abbottabad cricketers
Khyber Pakhtunkhwa cricketers
People from Mianwali District
Pakistani emigrants to Qatar
Pakistani expatriates in Qatar